Illadopsis (from illas, Greek for thrush and opsis, appearing) is a genus of secretive forest birds in the family Pellorneidae. All are found in tropical Africa, where they frequent the lower strata of forests, and reveal themselves mostly by their whistled call notes. The genus contains the following species:
 Blackcap illadopsis (Illadopsis cleaveri)
 Scaly-breasted illadopsis (Illadopsis albipectus)
 Rufous-winged illadopsis (Illadopsis rufescens)
 Puvel's illadopsis (Illadopsis puveli)
 Pale-breasted illadopsis (Illadopsis rufipennis)
 Tanzanian illadopsis (Illadopsis distans)
 Brown illadopsis (Illadopsis fulvescens)
 Mountain illadopsis (Illadopsis pyrrhoptera)
 Spotted thrush-babbler (Illadopsis turdina)

References

 Del Hoyo, J.; Elliot, A. & Christie D. (editors). (2007). Handbook of the Birds of the World. Volume 12: Picathartes to Tits and Chickadees. Lynx Edicions. 

 
Pellorneidae
Bird genera
 
Taxonomy articles created by Polbot